One Survivor Remembers is a 1995 documentary short film by Kary Antholis.

Summary
Holocaust survivor Gerda Weissmann Klein recounts her six-year ordeal as a victim of Nazi cruelty, including the loss of her parents, brother, friends, home, possessions, and community.

Legacy
A production of HBO and the United States Holocaust Memorial Museum, the film won the 1996 Oscar for Best Documentary Short Subject and the Primetime Emmy for Outstanding Informational Special. In 2005, the film was offered by the Southern Poverty Law Center’s Teaching Tolerance program for high school teachers to teach their students about the realities of the Holocaust.

In 2012, the film was selected for preservation in the United States National Film Registry by the Library of Congress as being "culturally, historically, or aesthetically significant".

See also 
List of Holocaust films
Anne Frank Remembered, the 1995 Oscar-winning documentary feature similar in content

References

External links
One Survivor Remembers essay  by Kary Antholis on the National Film Registry website 

Holocaust documentary film
One Survivor Remembers at United States Holocaust Memorial Museum
One Survivor Remembers at Teaching Tolerance

Personal accounts of the Holocaust
Best Documentary Short Subject Academy Award winners
1995 films
1990s short documentary films
American short documentary films
American independent films
Documentary films about the Holocaust
United States National Film Registry films
HBO documentary films
1995 independent films
Primetime Emmy Award-winning broadcasts
1990s English-language films
1990s American films